Gabriel Martinez (born 1967 in Miami, Florida) is a Cuban-American interdisciplinary artist based in Philadelphia, Pennsylvania, working mostly in photography, sculpture, installation and performance.

Martinez graduated from the University of Florida in 1989 with a Bachelor of Fine Arts in Photography.  He continued his education at the Tyler School of Art, Temple University, earning his Master of Fine Arts in Photography in 1991. Martinez attended the Skowhegan School of Sculpture and Painting in 2003. Martinez was a Pew Fellowship in the Arts recipient in 2001 and was a Joan Mitchell Foundation Fellowship recipient in 2003. He has received two Individual Artists Grants from the Pennsylvania Council on the Arts. Martinez has been an artist-in-residence at both the Fabric Workshop and Museum and at the Rosenbach Museum and Library, both in Philadelphia.

Martinez's work over the last seventeen years has most often been focused upon the male body. Early on, Martinez used his own naked body in both photography and performance-based works. His work from about 1997 to present has in many ways embodied the homosexual male gaze upon the heterosexual male body. The work typically evokes tension and apprehension.

His best-known body of work perhaps is "Self Portraits by Heterosexual Men." In 1998, Martinez created ambrotypes from 'self-portraits' recorded on 35mm film by one hundred, presumably straight men who took the shots at the point of manually, self-induced ecstasy (with the assistance of a cable release). In 2007, Martinez revisited this project arming the performers with a digital camera and a remote controlled shutter release with multi-exposure capabilities. This allowed the men to snap several photos during the time of expulsion and gave Martinez the ability to select the most expressive image for the individual giving insight on the location and objects the performer kept around at the time of the act. The project was composed of one hundred 20" x 30" framed c-prints.

Martinez held the position of Director of Graduate Photography Studies from 2004 to 2007 at the University of Pennsylvania and is currently the Coordinator of Undergraduate Photography at University of Pennsylvania.

Martinez work has been exhibited extensively: the Philadelphia Museum of Art (2006); Bernice Steinbaum Gallery, Miami, FL (2004); Philadelphia Art Alliance (2003); Nexus Gallery, Philadelphia (1998, 1995); White Columns, New York, NY (1995). Over seventy group exhibitions since 1989, including Exit Art, NY (2006, 2005); Art Mur Gallery, Montreal, Canada (2005); Gallery Muu, Helsinki, Finland (2004); Athens Institute for Contemporary Art, Athens, GA (2004); Miami Art Central, Miami, FL (2004); Goliath Visual Space, Brooklyn, NY (2004); Samson Projects, Boston (2004); Thread Waxing Space, New York, NY (2000); Cleveland Museum of Art, Cleveland, OH (2000); Fabric Workshop & Museum, Philadelphia, PA (1998); Philadelphia Museum of Art (1998, 1997); Franklin Furnace, New York (1997); Institute of Contemporary Art, Philadelphia (1996); Centro Cultural Ricardo Rojas, Buenos Aires, Argentina (1995); ABC No Rio, New York (1992).

Books and Catalogues 
 Self-Portraits (Samson Projects, 2007)

External links 
 Gabriel Martinez.com.
 Gabriel Martinez on Artnet.

1967 births
American people of Cuban descent
Artists from Miami
University of Florida alumni
Living people
Pew Fellows in the Arts